The Last Ones is a 2020 Estonian-Finnish drama film directed by Veiko Õunpuu. It was selected as the Estonian entry for the Best International Feature Film at the 93rd Academy Awards, but it was not nominated.

Plot
In a mining village in Lapland, reindeer herders and miners worry about their future.

Cast
 Pääru Oja as Rupi
 Tommi Korpela as Kari Kolehmainen
 Laura Birn as Riitta
 Elmer Bäck as Lievonen
 Sulevi Peltola as Chief Oula
 Samuli Edelmann as Tatu
 Jarkko Lahti as Foreman
 Tero Jartti as Moilanen
 Indrek Spungin as Kinnunen
 Emmi Parviainen as Sanna
 Juhan Ulfsak as Butcher
 Taavi Eelmaa as Boatswain Dieter
 Veiko Õunpuu as Helmsman Bohlen
 Pirjo Leppänen as Maisa
 Timo-Pekka Luoma as Miner
 Tom Petäjä as Policeman
 Pasi Kajo as Policeman
 Jouni Laaksomies as Politician

See also
 List of submissions to the 93rd Academy Awards for Best International Feature Film
 List of Estonian submissions for the Academy Award for Best International Feature Film

References

External links
 

2020 films
2020 drama films
Estonian drama films
Finnish drama films
2020s Finnish-language films